Tanioka (written: 谷岡) is a Japanese surname. Notable people with the surname include:

, Japanese video game music composer and pianist
, Japanese politician
, Japanese announcer

Japanese-language surnames